The 1985 European Cup Winners' Cup Final was a football match contested between Everton of England and Rapid Wien of Austria. It was the final match of the 1984–85 European Cup Winners' Cup and the 25th European Cup Winners' Cup final. The final was held at Feijenoord Stadion in Rotterdam, Netherlands, on 15 May 1985. Everton, which dominated throughout, won the match 3–1 thanks to goals by Andy Gray, Trevor Steven and Kevin Sheedy. Everton were unable to defend the trophy: as league champions they would have entered the 1985–86 European Cup, but they were not permitted to play in either competition following the events at the Heysel Stadium, which saw all English clubs banned from European competitions.

Route to the final

Match

Details

See also
1984–85 European Cup Winners' Cup
1985 European Cup Final
1985 UEFA Cup Final
Everton F.C. in European football

External links
UEFA Cup Winners' Cup results at Rec.Sport.Soccer Statistics Foundation

3
Cup Winners' Cup Final
Cup Winners' Cup Final
Cup Winners' Cup Final
Cup Winners' Cup Final 1985
Cup Winners' Cup Final 1985
Cup Winners' Cup Final 1985
1985
May 1985 sports events in Europe
Sports competitions in Rotterdam
20th century in Rotterdam